The following is a list of Teucrium species accepted by Plants of the World Online at March 2021.

 Teucrium abolhayatensis Ranjbar & Mahmoudi
 Teucrium abutiloides L'Hér.
 Teucrium africanum Thunb.
 Teucrium afrum (Emb. & Maire) Pau & Font Quer
 Teucrium aladagense Vural & H.Duman
 Teucrium albicaule Toelken – scurfy germander (Australia)
 Teucrium albidum Munby
 Teucrium alborubrum Hemsl.
 Teucrium algarbiense (Cout.) Cout.
 Teucrium alopecurus de Noé
 Teucrium alpestre Sm.
 Teucrium alyssifolium Stapf
 Teucrium amplexicaule Benth.
 Teucrium andrusi Post
 Teucrium angustissimum Schreb.
 Teucrium anlungense C.Y.Wu & S.Chow
 Teucrium annandalei Mukerjee
 Teucrium antiatlanticum (Maire) Sauvage & Vindt
 Teucrium antilibanoticum Mouterde
 Teucrium antitauricum Ekim
 Teucrium apollinis Maire & Weiller
 Teucrium aragonense Loscos & J.Pardo
 Teucrium arduinoi L.
 Teucrium argutum R.Br. – native germander (Qld., N.S.W.)
 Teucrium aristatum Pérez Lara
 Teucrium aroanium Orph. ex Boiss.
 Teucrium asiaticum L.
 Teucrium atratum Pomel
 Teucrium aureiforme Pomel
 Teucrium aureocandidum Andr.
 Teucrium aureum Schreb.
 Teucrium balearicum (Coss. ex Pau) Castrov. & Bayon
 Teucrium balfourii Vierh.
 Teucrium balthazaris Sennen
 Teucrium baokangensis C.L.Xiang
 Teucrium barbarum Jahand. & Maire
 Teucrium barbeyanum Asch. & Taub. ex E.A.Durand & Barratte
 Teucrium betchei (F.Muell.) Kattari & Salmaki (Qld., N.S.W.)
 Teucrium betonicum L'Hér.
 Teucrium bicolor Sm.
 Teucrium bicoloreum Pau ex Vicioso
 Teucrium bidentatum Hemsl.
 Teucrium bogoutdinovae Melnikov
 Teucrium botrys L. - cutleaf germander
 Teucrium brachyandrum Puech
 Teucrium bracteatum Desf.
 Teucrium brevifolium Schreb.
 Teucrium bullatum Coss. & Balansa
 Teucrium burmanicum Mukerjee
 Teucrium buxifolium Schreb.
 Teucrium campanulatum L.
 Teucrium canadense L. – American germander, Canada germander, wood sage
 Teucrium canum Fisch. & C.A.Mey.
 Teucrium capitatum L.
 Teucrium carolipaui Vicioso ex Pau
 Teucrium carthaginense Lange
 Teucrium caucasigenum Melnikov
 Teucrium cavanillesianum Font Quer & Jeronimo
 Teucrium cavernarum P.H.Davis
 Teucrium chamaedrys L. – wall germander
 Teucrium chardonianum Maire & Wilczek
 Teucrium charidemi Sandwith
 Teucrium chasmophyticum Rech.f.
 Teucrium chlorocephalum Celak.
 Teucrium chlorostachyum Pau & Font Quer
 Teucrium chowii Y.H.Tong & N.H.Xia
 Teucrium chrysotrichum Lange
 Teucrium cincinnatum Maire
 Teucrium clementiae Ryding
 Teucrium coahuilanum B.L.Turner
 Teucrium compactum Clemente ex Lag.
 Teucrium coniortodes Boiss. & Blanche
 Teucrium corymbiferum Desf.
 Teucrium corymbosum R.Br. – forest germander (Australia, New Guinea)
 Teucrium cossonii D.Wood – fruity germander
 Teucrium creticum L.
 Teucrium cubense Jacq. – small coastal germander, dwarf germander
 Teucrium cuneifolium Sm.
 Teucrium cyprium Boiss.
 Teucrium cyrenaicum (Maire & Weiller) Brullo & Furnari
 Teucrium daucoides A.R.Bean
 Teucrium davaeanum Coss.
 Teucrium dealianum Emb. & Maire
 Teucrium decaisnei C.Presl
 Teucrium decipiens Coss. & Balansa
 Teucrium demnatense Coss. ex Batt.
 Teucrium disjunctum K.R.Thiele & K.A.Sheph.
 Teucrium divaricatum Sieber ex Heldr.
 Teucrium doumerguei Sennen
 Teucrium ducellieri Batt.
 Teucrium dumulosum (Rech.f.) Brullo & Guarino
 Teucrium dunense Sennen
 Teucrium eburneum Thulin
 Teucrium edetanum M.B.Crespo, Mateo & T.Navarro
 Teucrium embergeri (Sauvage & Vindt) El Oualidi, T.Navarro & A.Martin
 Teucrium eremaeum Diels (W.A.)
 Teucrium eriocephalum Willk.
 Teucrium eximium O.Schwartz
 Teucrium expassum Pau
 Teucrium fallax A.R.Bean
 Teucrium faurei Maire
 Teucrium fililobum F.Muell. ex Benth.
 Teucrium flavum L.
 Teucrium fragile Boiss.
 Teucrium franchetianum Rouy & Coincy
 Teucrium francisci-werneri Rech.f.
 Teucrium francoi M.Seq., Capelo, J.C.Costa & R.Jardim
 Teucrium freynii E.Rev. ex Willk.
 Teucrium fruticans L. – tree germander, shrubby germander
 Teucrium gabrieliae Bornm.
 Teucrium gattefossei Emb.
 Teucrium glandulosum Kellogg – sticky germander, desert germander
 Teucrium gnaphalodes L'Hér.
 Teucrium goetzei Gürke
 Teucrium gracile Barbey & Fors.-Major
 Teucrium grandifolium R.A.Clement
 Teucrium grandiusculum F.Muell. & Tate (W.A., S.A., N.T.)
 Teucrium grosii Pau
 Teucrium gypsophilum Emb. & Maire
 Teucrium haenseleri Boiss.
 Teucrium halacsyanum Heldr.
 Teucrium haradjanii Briq. ex Rech.f.
 Teucrium helichrysoides (Diels) Greuter & Burdet
 Teucrium heterophyllum L'Hér.
 Teucrium heterotrichum Briq. ex Rech.f.
 Teucrium heynei V.S.Kumar & Chakrab.
 Teucrium hieronymi Sennen
 Teucrium hifacense Pau
 Teucrium hijazicum Hedge & R.A.King
 Teucrium hircanicum L.
 Teucrium homotrichum (Font Quer) Rivas Mart.
 Teucrium huotii Emb. & Maire
 Teucrium integrifolium Benth. – teucry weed (W.A., N.T., Qld.)
 Teucrium intricatum Lange
 Teucrium irroratum A.R.Bean
 Teucrium japonicum Houtt.
 Teucrium joannis (Sauvage & Vindt) El Oualidi, T.Navarro & A.Martin
 Teucrium jolyi Mathez & Sauvage
 Teucrium jordanicum (Danin) Faried
 Teucrium junceum (A.Cunn. ex Walp.) Kattari & Heubl (Qld., N.S.W.)
 Teucrium kabylicum Batt.
 Teucrium karpasiticum Hadjik. & Hand
 Teucrium kotschyanum Poech
 Teucrium kraussii Codd
 Teucrium krymense Juz.
 Teucrium kyreniae (P.H.Davis) Hadjik. & Hand
 Teucrium labiosum C.Y.Wu & S.Chow
 Teucrium laciniatum Torr.
 Teucrium lamiifolium d'Urv.
 Teucrium lanigerum Lag.
 Teucrium laxum D.Don
 Teucrium leonis Sennen
 Teucrium lepicephalum Pau
 Teucrium leucocladum Boiss.
 Teucrium leucophyllum Montbret & Aucher ex Benth.
 Teucrium libanitis Schreb.
 Teucrium lini-vaccarii Pamp.
 Teucrium lucidum L.
 Teucrium lusitanicum Schreb.
 Teucrium luteum (Mill.) Degen
 Teucrium macrophyllum (C.Y.Wu & S.Chow) J.H.Zheng
 Teucrium macrum Boiss. & Hausskn.
 Teucrium maghrebinum Greuter & Burdet
 Teucrium malenconianum Maire
 Teucrium manghuaense Y.Z.Sun ex S.Chow
 Teucrium marum L.
 Teucrium mascatense Boiss.
 Teucrium massiliense L.
 Teucrium maximowiczii Prob.
 Teucrium melissoides Boiss. & Hausskn.
 Teucrium mesanidum (Litard. & Maire) Sauvage & Vindt
 Teucrium micranthum B.J.Conn (Qld.)
 Teucrium microphyllum Desf.
 Teucrium micropodioides Rouy
 Teucrium mideltense (Batt.) Humbert
 Teucrium miragestorum Gómez Nav., Roselló, P.P.Ferrer & Peris
 Teucrium mitecum Tattou & El Oualidi
 Teucrium modestum A.R.Bean
 Teucrium moleromesae Sánchez-Gómez, T.Navarro, J.F.Jiménez, J.B.Vera, Mota & del Río
 Teucrium montanum L.
 Teucrium montbretii Benth.
 Teucrium muletii Roselló, P.P.Ferrer, E.Laguna, Gómez Nav., A.Guillén & Peris
 Teucrium multicaule Montbret & Aucher ex Benth.
 Teucrium murcicum Sennen
 Teucrium musimonum Humbert ex Maire
 Teucrium myriocladum Diels (W.A.)
 Teucrium nanum C.Y.Wu & S.Chow
 Teucrium novorossicum Melnikov
 Teucrium nudicaule Hook.
 Teucrium nummulariifolium Baker
 Teucrium odontites Boiss. & Balansa
 Teucrium oliverianum Ging. ex Benth.
 Teucrium omeiense Y.Z.Sun
 Teucrium orientale L.
 Teucrium ornatum Hemsl.
 Teucrium oxylepis Font Quer
 Teucrium ozturkii A.P.Khokhr.
 Teucrium paederotoides Boiss.
 Teucrium pampaninii C.Du
 Teucrium parviflorum Schreb.
 Teucrium parvifolium (Hook.f.) Kattari & Salmaki
 Teucrium pernyi Franch.
 Teucrium persicum Boiss.
 Teucrium pestalozzae Boiss.
 Teucrium petelotii Doan ex Suddee & A.J.Paton
 Teucrium pilbaranum B.J.Conn (W.A.)
 Teucrium plectranthoides Gamble
 Teucrium polioides Ryding
 Teucrium polium L.
 Teucrium popovii R.A.King
 Teucrium procerum Boiss. & Blanche
 Teucrium proctorii L.O.Williams
 Teucrium pruinosum Boiss.
 Teucrium pseudaroanium Parolly, Erdag & Nordt
 Teucrium pseudochamaepitys L.
 Teucrium pseudoscorodonia Desf.
 Teucrium puberulum (F.Muell.) Kattari & Bräuchler (Qld., N.S.W.)
 Teucrium pugionifolium Pau
 Teucrium pumilum L.
 Teucrium pyrenaicum L.
 Teucrium quadrifarium Buch.-Ham. ex D.Don
 Teucrium racemosum R.Br. – forest germander (continental Australia)
 Teucrium radicans Bonnet & Barratte
 Teucrium ramaswamii M.B.Viswan. & Manik.
 Teucrium ramosissimum Desf.
 Teucrium reidii Toelken & D.Dean Cunn. (South Australia)
 Teucrium resupinatum Desf.
 Teucrium rhodocalyx O.Schwartz
 Teucrium rifanum (Maire & Sennen) Maire & Sennen
 Teucrium rigidum Benth.
 Teucrium rivas-martinezii Alcaraz, Garre, Mart.Parras & Peinado
 Teucrium rixanense Ruíz Torre & Ruíz Cast.
 Teucrium ronnigeri Sennen
 Teucrium rotundifolium Schreb.
 Teucrium rouyanum Coste & Soulié
 Teucrium royleanum Wall. ex Benth.
 Teucrium rupestre Coss. & Balansa
 Teucrium sagittatum A.R.Bean
 Teucrium salaminium Hadjik. & Hand
 Teucrium salviastrum Schreb.
 Teucrium sandrasicum O.Schwarz
 Teucrium sanguisorbifolium (Pau & Font Quer) Dobignard
 Teucrium santae Quézel & Simonn. ex Greuter & Burdet
 Teucrium sauvagei Le Houér.
 Teucrium scabrum Suddee & A.J.Paton
 Teucrium schoenenbergeri Nabli
 Teucrium scordium L.
 Teucrium scorodonia L. – woodland germander 
 Teucrium serpylloides Maire & Weiller
 Teucrium sessiliflorum Benth. (W.A., S.A., N.S.W., Vic.)
 Teucrium shanicum Mukerjee
 Teucrium siculum (Raf.) Guss.
 Teucrium similatum T.Navarro & Rosua
 Teucrium simplex Vaniot
 Teucrium sirnakense Özcan & Dirmenci
 Teucrium socinianum Boiss.
 Teucrium socotranum Vierh.
 Teucrium somalense Ryding
 Teucrium spinosum L.
 Teucrium stachyophyllum P.H.Davis
 Teucrium stocksianum Boiss.
 Teucrium subspinosum Pourr. ex Willd.
 Teucrium taiwanianum T.H.Hsieh & T.C.Huang
 Teucrium tananicum Maire
 Teucrium teinense Kudô
 Teucrium terciae (Sánchez-Gómez, M.A.Carrión & A.Hern.) Sánchez-Gómez, M.A.Carrión & A.Hern.
 Teucrium teresanum Blanca, Cueto & J.Fuentes
 Teucrium teucriiflorum (F.Muell.) Kattari & Salmaki (W.A., N.T., S.A., Qld.)
 Teucrium thieleanum B.J.Conn (Victoria, Australia)
 Teucrium thymifolium Schreb.
 Teucrium thymoides Pomel
 Teucrium townsendii Vasey & Rose
 Teucrium trifidum Retz.
 Teucrium tsinlingense C.Y.Wu & S.Chow
 Teucrium turredanum Losa & Rivas Goday
 Teucrium ussuriense Kom.
 Teucrium veronicoides Maxim.
 Teucrium vesicarium Mill.
 Teucrium vincentinum Rouy
 Teucrium viscidum Blume
 Teucrium wattii Prain
 Teucrium webbianum Boiss.
 Teucrium werneri Emb.
 Teucrium wightii Hook.f.
 Teucrium yemense Deflers
 Teucrium zaianum Emb. & Maire
 Teucrium zanonii Pamp.
 Teucrium × alexeenkoanum Juz.
 Teucrium × alrumanae M.B.Crespo & J.C.Cristóbal
 Teucrium × alvarezii Alcaraz, Sánchez-Gómez, De la Torre & S.Ríos
 Teucrium × arenicola M.B.Crespo & Camuñas
 Teucrium × badiae Sennen
 Teucrium × bergadense Sennen
 Teucrium × bubanii Sennen
 Teucrium × carmelitanum Roselló, P.P.Ferrer, A.Guillén, Gómez Nav., Peris & E.Laguna
 Teucrium × carvalhoae A.F.Carrillo, A.Hern., Coy, Güemes & Sánchez-Gómez
 Teucrium × coeleste Schreb.
 Teucrium × conquense M.B.Crespo & Mateo
 Teucrium × contejeanii Giraudias
 Teucrium × delatorrei M.B.Crespo & M.Á.Alonso
 Teucrium × djebalicum Font Quer
 Teucrium × eloualidii Sánchez-Gómez & T.Navarro
 Teucrium × estevei Alcaraz, Sánchez-Gómez & J.S.Carrión
 Teucrium × gnaphaureum M.B.Crespo & Mateo
 Teucrium × guarae-requenae P.P.Ferrer, E.Laguna, Gómez Nav., Roselló & Peris
 Teucrium × guemesii J.F.Jiménez, A.F.Carrillo, M.A.Carrión
 Teucrium × lucentinum M.B.Crespo, M.Á.Alonso, Camuñas & J.C.Cristóbal
 Teucrium × maestracense M.B.Crespo & Mateo
 Teucrium × mailhoi Giraudias
 Teucrium × mateoi Solanas, M.B.Crespo & De la Torre
 Teucrium × motae Lahora & Sánchez-Gómez
 Teucrium × mugronense P.P.Ferrer, Roselló, Gómez Nav. & Guara
 Teucrium × navarroi Sánchez-Gómez, Güemes, A.F.Carrillo, Coy & A.Hern.
 Teucrium × pierae Gómez Nav., P.P.Ferrer, R.Roselló, A.Guillén, E.Laguna & Per
 Teucrium × portusmagni Sánchez-Gómez, A.F.Carrillo, A.Hern. & T.Navarro
 Teucrium × pseudoaragonense M.B.Crespo & Mateo
 Teucrium × pseudothymifolium Sánchez-Gómez, Güemes & A.F.Carrillo
 Teucrium × pujolii Sennen
 Teucrium × rigualii De la Torre & Alcaraz
 Teucrium × riosii De la Torre & Alcaraz
 Teucrium × riverae De la Torre & Alcaraz
 Teucrium × robledoi De la Torre & Alcaraz
 Teucrium × rubrovirens Pau
 Teucrium × sagarrae Font Quer
 Teucrium × scorolepis Pajarón & A.Molina
 Teucrium × turianum M.B.Crespo, P.P.Ferrer, Roselló, M.A.Alonso, Juan & E.Laguna
 Teucrium × vallbonense M.B.Crespo, M.Á.Alonso, Camuñas & J.C.Cristóbal

References

Teucrium